Albert John (Al) Loquasto (Jr.) (June 21, 1940 – July 31, 1991), was an Italian-American racecar driver.

Born in Easton, Pennsylvania, Loquasto died in a plane crash in Fogelsville, Pennsylvania.  He drove in the USAC and CART Championship Car series, racing in the 1969–1980 and 1982–1983 seasons, with 61 combined career starts, including the 1976 and 1977 Indianapolis 500.  He finished in the top ten 11 times, with his best finish in 7th position in 1975 at Ontario. Loquasto raced on a tight budget, fielding his own cars which were often several years old. He qualified for his first Indy 500 after receiving technical assistance from Clint Brawner.  He also drove six NASCAR races from 1981 to 1982. Prior to his open-wheel career, Loquasto was a five-time national hillclimbing champion. Loquasto's chief occupation was as the owner of APCO, Inc., an automotive warranty company, and he was a veteran of the Vietnam War.  Loquasto was a fourth-degree member of the Knights of Columbus. 

Al Loquasto was the first cousin of Sicilian-American scenic designer and costume designer Santo Loquasto, and a distant cousin of Sicilian-American author Angelo F. Coniglio.  All are descendants of Libertino lo Guasto, a foundling born in Serradifalco, Sicily in 1796.  Al Loquasto's survivors include his spouse Sandra Loquasto and son A.J. (III) Loquasto.

Motorsports career results

NASCAR
(key) (Bold – Pole position awarded by qualifying time. Italics – Pole position earned by points standings or practice time. * – Most laps led.)

Winston Cup Series

Indianapolis 500

References

External links
 Loquasto's ancestry at rootsweb.com

1940 births
1991 deaths
Accidental deaths in Pennsylvania
American racing drivers
Indianapolis 500 drivers

IndyCar Series team owners
Racing drivers from Pennsylvania
American people of Italian descent
IndyCar Series people
NASCAR drivers
Champ Car drivers
Victims of aviation accidents or incidents in 1991
Victims of aviation accidents or incidents in the United States
Team Penske drivers